The 2020 Bucknell Bison football team represented Bucknell University in the 2020–21 NCAA Division I FCS football season. They were led by second-year head coach Dave Cecchini and played their home games at Christy Mathewson–Memorial Stadium. They played as a member of the Patriot League.

On July 13, 2020, the Patriot League announced that it would cancel its fall sports seasons due to the COVID-19 pandemic. The league announced a spring schedule on February 5, with the first games set to be played on March 13.

Schedule
Bucknell had games scheduled against Penn on September 19, Princeton on September 19, and Cornell on October 3, which were all later canceled before the start of the 2020 season.

References

Bucknell
Bucknell Bison football seasons
Bucknell Bison football